A universal translator is a device common to many science fiction works, especially on television. First described in Murray Leinster's 1945 novella "First Contact", the translator's purpose is to offer an instant translation of any language.

As a convention, it is used to remove the problem of translating between alien languages when it is not vital to the plot. Especially in science fiction television, translating a new language in every episode when a new species is encountered would consume time normally allotted for plot development and would potentially become repetitive to the point of annoyance. Occasionally, intelligent alien races are portrayed as being able to extrapolate the rules of English from little speech and rapidly become fluent in it, making the translator unnecessary.

While a universal translator seems unlikely, scientists continue to work towards similar real-world technologies involving small numbers of known languages.

General
As a rule, a universal translator is instantaneous, but if that language has never been recorded, there is sometimes a time delay until the translator can properly work out a translation, as is true of Star Trek. The operation of these translators is often explained as using some form of telepathy by reading the brain patterns of the speaker(s) to determine what they are saying; some writers seek greater plausibility by instead having computer translation that requires collecting a database of the new language, often by listening to radio transmissions.

The existence of a universal translator tends to raise questions from a logical perspective, such as:
 The continued functioning of the translator even when no device is evident;
 Multiple speakers hear speech in one and only one language (so for example, for a Spanish speaker and a German speaker listening to an Italian speaker the Spanish speaker would only hear Spanish and neither the original Italian nor the translated German, while the German speaker would not hear any Spanish nor Italian but only German);
 Characters' mouths move in sync with the translated words and not the original language;
 The ability for the translator to function in real-time even for languages with different word order (such as a phrase the horse standing in front of the barn would end up in Japanese as 納屋の前に立っている馬, lit. barn-in-front-at-standing-horse; however, there is no delay for the Japanese listener even when the English speaker has yet to mention the barn).

Nonetheless, it removes the need for cumbersome and potentially extensive subtitles, and it eliminates the rather unlikely supposition that every other race in the galaxy has gone to the trouble of learning English.

Fictional depictions

Doctor Who
Using a telepathic field, the TARDIS automatically translates most comprehensible languages (written and spoken) into a language understood by its pilot and each of the crew members. The field also translates what they say into a language appropriate for that time and location (e.g., speaking the appropriate dialect of Latin when in ancient Rome). This system has frequently been featured as a main part of the show. The TARDIS, and by extension a number of its major systems, including the translator, are telepathically linked to its pilot, the Doctor.  None of these systems appear able to function reliably when the Doctor is incapacitated.  In "The Fires of Pompeii", when companion Donna Noble attempts to speak the local language directly, her words are humorously rendered into what sounds to a local like Welsh. One flaw of this translation process is that if the language that a word is being translated into does not have a concept for it, e.g, the Romans don't have a word or a general understanding of "volcano" as Mt. Vesuvius has not erupted yet.

Farscape
On the TV show Farscape, John Crichton is injected with bacteria called translator microbes which function as a sort of universal translator. The microbes colonize the host's brainstem and translate anything spoken to the host, passing along the translated information to the host's brain.  This does not enable the injected person to speak other languages; they continue to speak their own language and are only understood by others as long as the listeners possess the microbes. The microbes sometimes fail to properly translate slang, translating it literally. Also, the translator microbes cannot translate the natural language of the alien Pilots or Diagnosans because every word in their language can contain thousands of meanings, far too many for the microbes to translate; thus Pilots must learn to speak in "simple sentences", while Diagnosans require interpreters. The implanted can learn to speak new languages if they want or to make communicating with non-injected individuals possible.  The crew of Moya learned English from Crichton, thereby being able to communicate with the non-implanted populace when the crew visited Earth. Some species, such as the Kalish, cannot use translator microbes because their body rejects them, so they must learn a new language through their own efforts.

The Hitchhiker's Guide to the Galaxy
In the universe of The Hitchhiker's Guide to the Galaxy, universal translation is made possible by a small fish called a "babel fish". The fish is inserted into the auditory canal where it feeds off the mental frequencies of those speaking to its host. In turn it excretes a translation into the brain of its host.

The book remarks that, by allowing everyone to understand each other, the babel fish has caused more wars than anything else in the universe.

The book also explains that the babel fish could not possibly have developed naturally and therefore proves the existence of God as its creator, which in turn proves the non-existence of God. Since God needs faith to exist, and this proof dispels the need for faith, this therefore causes God to vanish "in a puff of logic".

Men in Black
The Men in Black franchise possess a universal translator, which, as Agent K explains in the first film, Men in Black, they are not allowed to have because "human thought is so primitive, it's looked upon as an infectious disease in some of the better galaxies." remarking “That kinda makes you proud, doesn’t it?”

Neuromancer
In William Gibson's novel Neuromancer, along with the other novels in his Sprawl trilogy, Count Zero and Mona Lisa Overdrive, devices known as "microsofts" are small chips plugged into "wetware" sockets installed behind the user's ear, giving them certain knowledge and/or skills as long as they are plugged in, such as the ability to speak another language.  (The name is a combination of the words "micro" and "soft", and is not named after the software firm Microsoft.)

Star Control
In the Star Control computer game series, almost all races are implied to have universal translators; however, discrepancies between the ways aliens choose to translate themselves sometimes crop up and complicate communications. The VUX, for instance, are cited as having uniquely advanced skills in linguistics and can translate human language long before humans are capable of doing the same to the VUX. This created a problem during the first contact between Vux and humans, in a starship commanded by Captain Rand. According to Star Control: Great Battles of the Ur-Quan Conflict, Captain Rand is referred to as saying "That is one ugly sucker" when the image of a VUX first came onto his viewscreen. However, in Star Control II, Captain Rand is referred to as saying "That is the ugliest freak-face I've ever seen" to his first officer, along with joking that the VUX name stands for Very Ugly Xenoform. It is debatable which source is canon. Whichever the remark, it is implied that the VUX's advanced Universal Translator technologies conveyed the exact meaning of Captain Rand's words. The effete VUX used the insult as an excuse for hostility toward humans.

Also, a new race called the Orz was introduced in Star Control II. They presumably come from another dimension, and at first contact, the ship's computer says that there are many vocal anomalies in their language resulting from their referring to concepts or phenomena for which there are no equivalents in human language. The result is dialogue that is a patchwork of ordinary words and phrases marked with *asterisk pairs* indicating that they are loose translations of unique Orz concepts into human language, a full translation of which would probably require paragraph-long definitions. (For instance, the Orz refer to the human dimension as *heavy space* and their own as *Pretty Space*, to various categories of races as *happy campers* or *silly cows*, and so on.)

In the other direction, the Supox are a race portrayed as attempting to mimic as many aspects of other races' language and culture as possible when speaking to them, to the point of referring to their own planet as “Earth,” also leading to confusion.

In Star Control III, the K’tang are portrayed as an intellectually inferior species using advanced technology they do not fully understand to intimidate people, perhaps explaining why their translators’ output is littered with misspellings and nonstandard usages of words, like threatening to “crushify” the player. Along the same lines, the Daktaklakpak dialogue is highly stilted and contains many numbers and mathematical expressions, implying that, as a mechanical race, their thought processes are inherently too different from humans’ to be directly translated into human language.

Stargate
In the television shows Stargate SG-1 and Stargate Atlantis, there are no personal translation devices used, and most alien and Human cultures on other planets speak English. The makers of the show have themselves admitted this on the main SG-1 site, stating that this is to save spending ten minutes an episode on characters learning a new language (early episodes of SG-1 revealed the difficulties of attempting to write such processes into the plot). In the season 8 finale of SG-1, “Moebius (Part II),” the characters go back in time to 3000 B.C. and one of them teaches English to the people there.

A notable exception to this rule are the Goa’uld, who occasionally speak their own language amongst themselves or when giving orders to their Jaffa. This is never subtitled, but occasionally a translation is given by a third character (usually Teal'c or Daniel Jackson), ostensibly for the benefit of the human characters nearby who do not speak Goa’uld.  The Asgard are also shown having their own language (apparently related to the Norse languages), although it is English played backwards. (See Hermiod).

In contrast a major plot element of the original Stargate film was that Daniel Jackson had to learn the language of the people of Abydos in the common way, which turned out to be derived from ancient Egyptian. The language had been extinct on Earth for many millennia, but Jackson eventually realized that it was merely errors in pronunciation that prevented effective communication.

Star Trek
In Star Trek, the universal translator was used by Ensign Hoshi Sato, the communications officer on the Enterprise in Star Trek: Enterprise, to invent the linguacode matrix. It was supposedly first used in the late 22nd century on Earth for the instant translation of well-known Earth languages. Gradually, with the removal of language barriers, Earth's disparate cultures came to terms of universal peace. Translations of previously unknown languages, such as those of aliens, required more difficulties to be overcome.

Like most other common forms of Star Trek technology (warp drive, transporters, etc.), the universal translator was probably developed independently on several worlds as an inevitable requirement of space travel; certainly the Vulcans had no difficulty communicating with humans upon making "first contact" (although the Vulcans could have learned Standard English from monitoring Earth radio transmissions). The Vulcan ship that landed during First Contact was a survey vessel. The Vulcans had been surveying the humans for over a hundred years, when first contact actually occurred to T'Pol's great-grandmother, T'mir, in the episode "Carbon Creek"; however, in Star Trek First Contact it is implied that they learned English by surveying the planets in the Solar System. Deanna Troi mentions the Vulcans have no interest in Earth as it is "too primitive", but the Prime Directive states not to interfere with pre-Warp species. The Vulcans only noticed the warp trail and came to investigate.

Improbably, the universal translator has been successfully used to interpret non-biological lifeform communication (in the Original Series episode "Metamorphosis"). In the Star Trek: The Next Generation (TNG) episode "The Ensigns of Command", the translator proved ineffective with the language of the Sheliaks, so the Federation had to depend on the aliens' interpretation of Earth languages. The TNG episode "Darmok" also illustrates another instance where the universal translator proves ineffective and unintelligible, because the Tamarian language is too deeply rooted in local metaphor.

Unlike virtually every other form of Federation technology, universal translators almost never break down. A notable exception is in the Star Trek: Discovery episode "An Obol for Charon", where alien interference causes the translator to malfunction and translate crew speech and computer text into multiple languages at random, requiring Commander Saru's fluency in nearly one hundred languages to repair the problem. Although universal translators were clearly in widespread use during this era and Captain Kirk's time (inasmuch as the crew regularly communicated with species who could not conceivably have knowledge of Standard English), it is unclear where they were carried on personnel of that era.

The episode "Metamorphosis" was the only time in which the device was actually seen. In the episode "Arena" the Metrons supply Captain Kirk and the Gorn commander with a Translator-Communicator, allowing conversation between them to be possible. During Kirk's era, they were also apparently less perfect in their translations into Klingon. In the sixth Star Trek film, the characters are seen relying on print books in order to communicate with a Klingon military ship, since Chekov said that the Klingons would recognize the use of a Translator. Actress Nichelle Nichols reportedly protested this scene, as she felt that Uhura, as communications officer during what was effectively a cold war, would be trained in fluent Klingon to aid in such situations. In that same movie during the trial scene of Kirk and McCoy before a Klingon judiciary, the Captain and the Doctor are holding communication devices while a Klingon (played by Todd Bryant) translates for them. The novelization of that movie provided a different reason for the use of books: sabotage by somebody working on the Starfleet side of the conspiracy uncovered by the crew in the story, but the novelization is not part of the Star Trek canon.

By the 24th century, universal translators are built into the communicator pins worn by Starfleet personnel, although there were instances when crew members (such as Riker in the Next Generation episode "First Contact") spoke to newly encountered aliens even when deprived of their communicators. In the Star Trek: Voyager episode "The 37's" the device apparently works among intra-species languages as well; after the Voyager crew discovers and revives eight humans abducted in 1937 (including Amelia Earhart and Fred Noonan) and held in stasis since then, a Japanese Army officer expresses surprise that an Ohio farmer is apparently speaking Japanese, while the farmer is equally surprised to hear the soldier speaking English (the audience hears them all speaking English only, however). Certain Starfleet programs, such as the Emergency Medical Hologram, have universal translators encoded into the programming.

The Star Trek: The Next Generation Technical Manual says that the universal translator is an "extremely sophisticated computer program" which functions by "analyzing the patterns" of an unknown foreign language, starting from a speech sample of two or more speakers in conversation. The more extensive the conversational sample, the more accurate and reliable is the "translation matrix", enabling instantaneous conversion of verbal utterances or written text between the alien language and American English / Federation Standard.

In some episodes of Star Trek: Deep Space Nine, we see a Cardassian universal translator at work. It takes some time to process an alien language, whose speakers are initially not understandable but as they continue speaking, the computer gradually learns their language and renders it into Standard English (also known as Federation Standard).

Ferengi customarily wear their universal translators as an implant in their ears. In the Star Trek: Deep Space Nine (DS9) episode "Little Green Men", in which the show's regular Ferengi accidentally become the three aliens in Roswell, the humans without translators are unable to understand the Ferengi (who likewise can not understand the English spoken by the human observers) until the Ferengi get their own translators working. Similarly, throughout all Trek series, a universal translator possessed by only one party can audibly broadcast the results within a limited range, enabling communication between two or more parties, all speaking different languages. The devices appear to be standard equipment on starships and space stations, where a communicator pin would therefore presumably not be strictly necessary.

Since the Universal Translator presumably does not physically affect the process by which the user's vocal cords (or alien equivalent) forms audible speech (i.e. the user is nonetheless speaking in his/her/its own language regardless of the listener's language), the listener apparently hears only the speaker's translated words and not the alien language that the speaker is actually, physically articulating; the unfamiliar oratory is therefore not only translated but somehow replaced. The universal translator is often used in cases of contact with pre-warp societies such as in the Star Trek: The Next Generation episode "Who Watches the Watchers", and its detection could conceivably lead to a violation of the Prime Directive. Therefore, logically there must be some mechanism by which the lips of the speaker are perceived to be in sync with the words spoken. No explanation of the mechanics of this function appears to have been provided; the viewer is required to suspend disbelief enough to overcome the apparent limitation.

Non-fictional translators 

Microsoft is developing its own translation technology, for incorporation into many of their software products and services. Most notably this includes real-time translation of video calls with Skype Translator. As of July 2019, Microsoft Translator supports over 65 languages and can translate video calls between English, French, German, Chinese (Mandarin), Italian, and Spanish.

In 2010, Google announced that it was developing a translator. Using a voice recognition system and a database, a robotic voice will recite the translation in the desired language.
Google's stated aim is to translate the entire world's information. Roya Soleimani, a spokesperson for Google, said during a 2013 interview demonstrating the translation app on a smartphone, "You can have access to the world's languages right in your pocket... The goal is to become that ultimate Star Trek computer."
 
The United States Army has also developed a two-way translator for use in Iraq.  TRANSTAC (Spoken Language Communication and Translation System for Tactical Use), though, only focuses on Arabic-English translation.
The United States Army has scrapped the TRANSTAC Program and is developing in conjunction with DARPA, the BOLT (Broad Operational Language Translation) in its place.

In February 2010, a communications software called VoxOx launched a two-way translator service for instant messaging, SMS, email and social media titled the VoxOx Universal Translator.
It enables two people to communicate instantly with each other while both typing in their native languages.

See also

 Interlingual machine translation
 List of language interpreters in fiction
 Mobile translation
 Pivot language
 Phraselator
 Speech translation
 Universal language
 See speech recognition, machine translation and speech synthesis for discussions of real-world natural language processing technologies.

References

External links
 
 Reverse-engineering the universal translator

Emerging technologies
Fictional technology
Interpreting and translation in fiction
Science fiction themes
Star Trek devices
Machine translation
Fictional alien languages